15α-Hydroxyestradiol (15α-OH-E2) is an endogenous estrogen which occurs during pregnancy. It is structurally related to estriol (16α-hydroxyestradiol) and estetrol (15α-hydroxyestriol or 15α,16α-dihydroxyestradiol).

References

Estranes
Estrogens
Hormones of the hypothalamus-pituitary-gonad axis
Hormones of the pregnant female
Phenols
Triols